The 2020 San Diego State Aztecs football team represented San Diego State University in the 2020 NCAA Division I FBS football season. The Aztecs were led by head coach Brady Hoke, in the first season of his second stint, and played their home games at Dignity Health Sports Park in Carson, California, as a member of the Mountain West Conference.

On August 10, 2020, the Mountain West Conference suspended all fall sports competitions due to the COVID-19 pandemic. However, the conference later reversed course and announced plans to resume play on October 24.

Dignity Health Sports Park, also home to LA Galaxy in Major League Soccer and Los Angeles Wildcats of the XFL, as well as a former home stadium of the NFL's Los Angeles Chargers (which once coincidentally represented San Diego), served as the team's temporary home. The program's former home venue, SDCCU Stadium, is being demolished and will be replaced by Aztec Stadium. This was originally announced when the Mountain West planned to postpone its season.

After finishing their season with a 4–4 record (4–2 in conference games), Hoke announced on December 16 that the program was removing itself from consideration for a bowl game.

Schedules

Original

Revised
Following cancellation of the Fresno State game scheduled for November 27, a replacement game against Colorado was scheduled for November 28; Colorado had been scheduled to play USC, which was also canceled.

Players drafted into the NFL

References

San Diego State
San Diego State Aztecs football seasons
San Diego State Aztecs football